Argynnis is a genus of butterflies in the family Nymphalidae, one of several groups known as "fritillaries". Its species are commonly found in Europe and Asia.

Systematics
Several current species of Argynnis used to be included in distinct genera, such as Argyreus (for A. hyperbius), Argyronome (for A. laodice, A. ruslana, and A. kuniga), Childrena (forA. childreni and A. zenobia), and Damora (for A. sagana). All of these genera are now viewed as junior synonyms of Argynnis.

Speyeria and Fabriciana used to be viewed as subgenera or synonyms of Argynnis too, but are now considered separate genera, with Speyeria encompassing the earlier Mesoacidalia.

List of species
Listed alphabetically:
 Argynnis anadyomene C. & R. Felder, 1862
 Argynnis childreni Gray, 1831
 Argynnis hyperbius (Linnaeus, 1763) – Indian fritillary
 Argynnis kuniga (Chou & Tong, 1994)
 Argynnis laodice (Pallas, 1771) – Pallas's fritillary
 Argynnis pandora (Denis & Schiffermüller, 1775) – Cardinal or Mediterranean fritillary 
 Argynnis paphia (Linnaeus, 1758) – Silver-washed fritillary 
 Argynnis ruslana Motschulsky, 1866
 Argynnis sagana Doubleday, 1847
 Argynnis zenobia Leech, 1890

References

External links
Images representing Argynnis at Consortium for the Barcode of Life
Images representing Argynnis at Encyclopedia of Life 

 
Argynnini
Nymphalidae genera